Schwinger can refer to:
 Gene Schwinger (1932–2020), American basketball player
 Julian Schwinger (1918–1994), a physicist
 the Schwinger model, which he created
 a song by the German band Seeed, from their album Next!
 a participant in schwingen wrestling

See also
Swinger (disambiguation)